Lodi is an unincorporated community in Custer County, Nebraska, United States.

History
A post office was established at Lodi in 1882, and remained in operation until it was discontinued in 1928. The community was named after the Italian city of Lodi, Lombardy.

References

Populated places in Custer County, Nebraska
Unincorporated communities in Nebraska